Guðjón Davíð Karlsson (born 8 April 1980) is an Icelandic actor and writer. Commonly known as Gói, he is known for Let Me Fall (2018), Trapped (2015) and Blackport (2021). He graduated from the Iceland Academy of the Arts in 2005.

Personal life
Guðjón is the son of Karl Sigurbjörnsson, who served as Bishop of Iceland from 1998 to 2012.

In 2009, Guðjón married Ingibjörg Ýr Óskarsdóttir. Together they have three children.

References

External links

Living people
1980 births
21st-century Icelandic male actors
Icelandic male television actors
Icelandic male film actors
Icelandic male stage actors
Male actors from Reykjavík